Vietnam has submitted films for the Academy Award for Best International Feature Film since 1993. The award, previously named the Academy Award for Best Foreign Language Film, is presented annually by the U.S. Academy of Motion Picture Arts and Sciences (AMPAS) to a feature-length motion picture produced outside the United States that contains primarily non-English dialogue. It was not created until the 1956 Academy Awards, in which a competitive Academy Award of Merit, known as the Best Foreign Language Film Award, was introduced for non-English speaking films, and has been given annually since.

Trần Anh Hùng's The Scent of Green Papaya was Vietnam's first submission for the 1993 awards. Despite the film being financed and produced in France, Hùng asked permission to represent Vietnam instead—it uses mainly Vietnamese language and the characters are portrayed by Vietnamese actors. It is the only Vietnamese film to secure a nomination, and was the first nomination received by a Southeast Asian country in the category. The Scent of Green Papaya and the three subsequent submissions—Hồ Quang Minh's Gone, Gone Forever Gone (1996), Tony Bui's Three Seasons (1999), and Hùng's Vertical Ray of the Sun (2000)—were directed by overseas Vietnamese directors and chosen without any support councils, deriving solely from the directors' relationship with foreign partners. Of all four, only Gone, Gone Forever Gone was domestically funded. In September 2003, the Ministry of Culture and Information decided to send Đỗ Minh Tuấn's Foul King, a film entirety produced by Vietnamese, to compete in the category. It was not, however, included on the final list announced by the AMPAS in October.

Vietnam initially received the AMPAS' invitation to participate in the competition in 2006, when a requirement was introduced that films needed to be commercially-released for at least seven consecutive days in a movie theater in its respective country during the eligibility period. The Buffalo Boy was the first selection by the Ministry of Culture and Information following the invitation. The ministry was merged into the Vietnamese Ministry of Culture, Sports and Tourism (MCST) in 2007, who has since decided the submissions annually. , Vietnam has successfully submitted eighteen films—578 Magnum (2022) is the most recent submission in this category.

Submissions

The AMPAS has invited the film industries of various countries to submit their best film for the Academy Award for Best Foreign Language Film since 1956, while The Foreign Language Film Award Committee oversees the process and reviews all the submitted films. They vote via secret ballot to determine the five nominees for the award.

The Vietnamese submission is chosen by the MCST, formerly the Ministry of Culture and Information, since 2006. The MCST appoints a council to choose one film among those released that year to be submitted as Vietnam's official entry the following year. The council works on the principle of public discussion and votes via secret ballot—the chosen film must attain the highest score on a 10-point scale and the average above 9 points. The chosen films, along with their English subtitles, are sent to the AMPAS, where they are screened for the jury.

In 2008, Black Forest (Rừng đen) was the only film submitted to an open call for entries but was deemed ineligible since it had not been screened in a commercial cinema per AMPAS requirements. Similarly, the MCST chose not make an entry in 2013, when the only available film Blood Letter (Thiên mệnh anh hùng) did not meet the release time. Vietnam also chose not make a 2010 entry because the films reviewed did not meet the requirements; while in 2014, they did not receive any invitation from the AMPAS for the first time since 2006.

See also

 List of Academy Award winners and nominees for Best International Feature Film
 List of Asian Academy Award winners and nominees

Notes

References

External links
 The Official Academy Awards Database

Vietnam
Academy Award for Best Foreign Language Film